The New South Wales Arrows are a nationally competing field hockey team based in Sydney, Australia. 
 Their most recent Australian Hockey League title win was in 2014. In 2015, NSW beat the ACT in the bronze medal playoff, securing 3rd place in the final rankings after beating Canberra Labor Club Strikers 3-1. The NSW Arrows are the most successful team in the AHL, winning a record 9 titles in the years 1993, 1996, 1998-2002, 2009 and 2014.

See also

 Sports in Australia
 Field hockey

References

External links
 Hockey NSW

Australian field hockey clubs
Sports teams in Sydney
Women's field hockey teams in Australia
Field hockey in New South Wales